On Wednesday, June 13, 2012, Matt Cain of the San Francisco Giants pitched the 22nd perfect game in Major League Baseball (MLB) history and the first in Giants' franchise history. Prior to the game, Cain and professional golfer Dustin Johnson hit golf balls from home plate into McCovey Cove. Pitching against the Houston Astros at AT&T Park in San Francisco, California,  Cain retired all 27 batters that he faced and tallied 14 strikeouts,  tied for the most strikeouts in a perfect game with Sandy Koufax of the Los Angeles Dodgers in 1965. Following Philip Humber's perfect game earlier in 2012, Cain's performance marked just the third season in MLB history in which multiple perfect games were thrown.  In June 1880, Lee Richmond and John Montgomery Ward both threw perfect games; in May 2010  Dallas Braden and Roy Halladay both accomplished the feat.

Two notable defensive plays by Cain's teammates kept the perfect game intact. Melky Cabrera made a running catch at the wall in left field in the top of the sixth inning, while Gregor Blanco made a diving catch in right-center field to start the top of the seventh.

It was the first Giants no-hitter since left-hander Jonathan Sánchez threw one on July 10, 2009, against the San Diego Padres at AT&T Park. The Astros were no-hit for the fifth time in franchise history, and the first time since Carlos Zambrano threw a no-hitter for the Chicago Cubs on September 14, 2008 at Miller Park (moved from Minute Maid Park because of Hurricane Ike). It was the second time the Astros were no-hit by the Giants; Juan Marichal did it on June 15, 1963. It was also the first time in Astros history that no one reached base safely.

Cain surpassed his previous personal best of 12 strikeouts in a single game, which he set in 2006. Cain's 125 pitches were the most thrown in a Major League perfect game. The Giants recorded 10 runs, the most by any team in a perfect game. By scoring a run in the 5th inning, Cain became the only pitcher to have scored a run in his perfect game.

The final out was made by Astros pinch-hitter Jason Castro.  Castro chopped a 1-2 pitch to third base where it was fielded deep behind the bag by third baseman Joaquin Arias.  Arias successfully made the long throw across the diamond to first baseman Brandon Belt, who then tucked the ball in his back pocket before joining his teammates on the mound in celebration.

Statistics

Linescore

Box score

FIELDING
DP: Lowrie-Altuve-Wallace.

BATTING
2B: Arias, Joa (4, Happ); Posey (13, Happ); Sandoval (7, Cedeno).
HR: Cabrera, Me (5, 1st inning off Happ, 1 on, 1 out); Belt (2, 2nd inning off Happ, 1 on, 0 out); Blanco, G (4, 5th inning off Cruz, R, 1 on, 0 out)
TB: Theriot 2; Sandoval 4; Cain, M; Blanco, G 5; Arias, Joa 2; Belt 5; Posey 3; Cabrera, Me 5.
RBI: Cabrera, Me 2 (31); Belt 3 (22); Blanco, G 3 (15); Sandoval 2 (18).
Runners left in scoring position, 2 out: Blanco, G 2; Arias, Joa 3.
SAC: Cain, M.
GIDP: Burriss.
Team RISP: 2-for-10.
Team LOB: 7.

Other info
HBP: Arias, Joa (by Happ).
Pitches-strikes: Happ 86-53; Cruz, R 28-15; Cedeno 40-29; Cain, M 125-86.
Groundouts-flyouts: Happ 3-0; Cruz, R 3-1; Cedeno 6-1; Cain, M 6-6.
Batters faced: Happ 23; Cruz, R 8; Cedeno 10; Cain, M 27.
Inherited runners-scored: Cruz, R 3-1.
Umpires: HP: Ted Barrett; 1B: Mike Muchlinski; 2B: Angel Campos; 3B: Brian Runge.
Weather: , clear.
Wind: 13 mph, Out to CF
Time: 2:36
Attendance: 42,298

Reactions

Aftermath
Cain's cleats, hat, uniform, dirt taken from the pitcher's mound, and a ball from the game will be included in an exhibit in the National Baseball Hall of Fame and Museum. All four umpires signed a game ball for Cain, and Belt gave Cain the ball used to record the final out.

According to Bill James' game score statistic, Cain's perfect game tied Sandy Koufax's perfect game for the most dominant modern-era perfect game.

See also

 List of Major League Baseball no-hitters

References

2012 Major League Baseball season
Major League Baseball perfect games
San Francisco Giants
Houston Astros
June 2012 sports events in the United States
2012 in sports in California
2012 in San Francisco
Baseball competitions in San Francisco